Beahitse is a town and commune in southwestern Madagascar. It belongs to the district of Ampanihy, which is a part of Atsimo-Andrefana Region. The population of the commune was estimated to be approximately 17,000 in 2001 commune census.

Only primary schooling is available. It is also a site of industrial-scale  mining. The majority 90% of the population of the commune are farmers, while an additional 5% receives their livelihood from raising livestock. The most important crop is maize, while other important products are peanuts, cassava and sweet potatoes.  Industry and services provide employment for 1% and 4% of the population, respectively.

References and notes 

Populated places in Atsimo-Andrefana